The Fall of Wu may refer to either of

 Conquest of Wu by Yue during the Spring and Autumn Period
 Conquest of Sun Wu by Jin during the Three Kingdoms Period